Krishnamurthy Siddharth (born 22 November 1992) is an Indian cricketer. He made his first-class debut for Karnataka in the 2018–19 Ranji Trophy on 12 November 2018. He was the leading run-scorer for Karnataka in the group-stage of the 2018–19 Ranji Trophy, with 651 runs in eight matches. He made his Twenty20 debut for Karnataka in the 2018–19 Syed Mushtaq Ali Trophy on 21 February 2019. He made his List A debut on 26 September 2019, for Karnataka in the 2019–20 Vijay Hazare Trophy. He was also the highest scorer for Karnataka with 410 runs in four matches in the 2021–22 Ranji Trophy.

References

External links
 

1992 births
Living people
Indian cricketers
Karnataka cricketers
Place of birth missing (living people)